Brian McCabe is a Scottish writer, tutor and editor, best known for his short stories and poetry.

Biography 
Born in 1951, McCabe grew up in Bonnyrigg, a mining community near Edinburgh. He studied Literature and Philosophy at the University of Edinburgh, where he encountered other young writers such as Ron Butlin and Andrew Greig and was influenced by older Edinburgh poets such as Norman MacCaig and Robert Garioch. Along with Greig, Butlin and Liz Lochhead, McCabe was one of "The Lost Poets," a rough collective which organised readings and other events in central Scotland in the early 1970s.

Since 1980, McCabe has been a full-time writer and has held a number of fellowships both in Scotland and abroad, including a residence at the University of Edinburgh. He has published three collections of short stories, one novel The Other McCoy (1991), and five volumes of poetry. His Selected Stories was published in 2003.  As well as poetry and fiction, McCabe writes radio drama.

In 2004, McCabe became editor of Edinburgh Review. As a creative writing tutor, he has worked at the universities of Lancaster, St. Andrews and Edinburgh, besides numerous community projects.

References

External links
 

Living people
Scottish poets
Scottish short story writers
Alumni of the University of Edinburgh
Academics of the University of Edinburgh
People educated at Lasswade High School Centre
Year of birth missing (living people)